Jordan Branch may refer to:

Jordan Branch, Nova Scotia, a community in the Municipality of the District of Shelburne
Jordan Branch (Bee Creek tributary), a stream in Missouri
Jordan Branch (Saint Johns Creek tributary), a stream in Missouri
Jordan Branch (Sewell Branch tributary), Kent County, Delaware